In Concert Volume Two  may refer to:
 In Concert Volume Two (Amy Grant album)
 In Concert Volume Two (Freddie Hubbard & Stanley Turrentine album)

See also
 In Concert (disambiguation)